Tomopterus staphylinus  is a species of beetle in the family Cerambycidae. It was described by Audinet-Serville in 1833.

References

Tomopterus
Beetles described in 1833